The Kaleidica Light Instrument, is software developed by Chuck Henderson and published by Fishrock Studios for creating symmetrical and abstract pattern art, animations and real-time user-generated light-shows much like a mechanical kaleidoscope. Kaleidica creates imagery and script-generated animations based on a number of geometric algorithms that arrange arrays of images or animation clips in various user-determined patterns. Composed of multiple internal "studios," Kaleidica can produce patterns reminiscent of kaleidoscope art, Arabic tapestries, psychedelic "op-art," mandala and yantra meditative patterns, and abstract forms akin to Kandinsky or Renoir. Kaleidica uses images as brushes that are selected from a collection of image libraries. Images libraries can be changed and new libraries can be created by users. Animated brush effects are created by cycling through a series of images creating three dimensional and abstract effects.

In light-show mode users of the Kaleidica are able to move the mouse in-sync with music and simultaneously manipulate a variety of functions using the keyboard. Subtle and vigorous effects can be achieved by manipulating blend, rotation, image-brush size, skew, etc.

The sequel to Yantram: Sacred Art Toolbox (Published in 2000 also by fishrock studios), Kaleidica enables users to record and play-back the process of creating symmetrical art, effectively creating full-screen animations. Using simultaneous input from both keyboard and mouse, users manipulate the position, size, rotation, blend, skew and other variables in real-time. Computers with modest video card and processor speeds can display evolving artwork in sync with live or recorded music suitable for interactive light-shows. Kaleidica uses single images and loops of sequential images as animated brushes. These image-brushes are written to the screen buffer much like paint applied to a canvas. In the case of Kaleidica multiple brush strokes are applies simultaneously to create the kaleidoscopic variations.

Description

Kaleidica is based on a system of studios, each of which can produce a distinct effect. In each studio, the user controls the movement of the brushes with the mouse, while manipulating the characteristics of the brush (like size or rotation) with the keyboard.

The studios inside Kaleidica include the maze studio, the mirror studio, the star studio, the array studio, and the kaleido studio, among others.

In most Kaleidica Studios the same brush appears multiple times on the screen, each brush exactly mimicking the others. The brush appears as many times as the user specifies, each radiating from the central point called a "centroid" which can be placed anywhere inside or outside the screen.

Users may retrieve content from the program by capturing the screen. As well, users can record their actions on the screen in real time to be later replayed.

Custom Content
Users can upload their own content into Kaleidica, using their own images as brushes. The Kaleidica website sometimes has updated brushes and studios, such as the recent Louvre studio.

See also
Kaleidoscope

References

External links
Fishrock Studios website
Official Kaleidica website

Image processing software
Abstract animation